General Landry may refer to:

Robert B. Landry (1909–2000), U.S. Air Force major general
List of Stargate SG-1 characters#Hank Landry, a fictional general

See also
Mary Landry (fl. 2010s), U.S. Coast Guard rear admiral
Attorney General Landry (disambiguation)